Louis-Henri Blais (June 9, 1827 – August 21, 1899) was a lawyer and political figure in Quebec. He represented Montmagny in the Legislative Assembly of Quebec from 1867 to 1871 as a Liberal.

He was born in Montmagny, Lower Canada, the son of Louis Blais and Marie-Madeleine Noël. Blais was educated at the Collège de Sainte-Anne-de-la-Pocatière, was called to the Quebec bar in 1851 and set up practice in Montmagny. He was president of the Agricultural Society for Montmagny County. Blais was married twice: to Marie-Anne-Hermélène Fournier in 1849 and to Eugénie Blais in 1872. He ran unsuccessfully to represent Montmagny in the legislative assembly for the Province of Canada in 1863. He died in Montmagny at the age of 72.

References 
 

1827 births
1899 deaths
Quebec Liberal Party MNAs